Bendida Peak is the ice-covered peak rising to 1339 m in the north foothills of Detroit Plateau on Trinity Peninsula in Graham Land, Antarctica.  It is surmounting a tributary glacier to the west that is flowing northwestwards into Pettus Glacier.

The peak is named after the Thracian goddess Bendida.

Location
German-British mapping in 1996.

Maps
 Trinity Peninsula. Scale 1:250000 topographic map No. 5697. Institut für Angewandte Geodäsie and British Antarctic Survey, 1996.
 Antarctic Digital Database (ADD). Scale 1:250000 topographic map of Antarctica. Scientific Committee on Antarctic Research (SCAR), 1993–2016.

Notes

References
 Bendida Peak. SCAR Composite Antarctic Gazetteer
 Bulgarian Antarctic Gazetteer. Antarctic Place-names Commission. (details in Bulgarian, basic data in English)

External links
 Bendida Peak. Copernix satellite image

Mountains of Trinity Peninsula
Bulgaria and the Antarctic